José Luis de Gonzaga Espinosa de los Monteros y Alcalá (June 21, 1932, Mérida, Yucatán, Mexico – January 1, 2009) better known as Luis Espinosa-Alcalá was a Mexican poet, songwriter, and music promoter.

Espinosa-Alcalá is considered the "Mayab's Musical Landscaper" due to his delicate use of ecphrasis to describe, for example, how one walks over a red carpet of Flamboyant tree flowers or sits on a bench in the central park of Mérida, Yucatán to enjoy the surrounding ambience. Many of his songs have become classics in regional music, such as "A Yucatán", "Mérida Colonial", "Guitarrita Yucateca", and "Flamboyán del Camino". Among his other well-known songs are "Ríe", "Silencio Azul" and "La Tormenta". Espinosa-Alcalá released under the Orbit Musical record label nearly 40 albums, including both his own songs and many others of musicians from the Yucatán Peninsula.

References

"Perfiles Yucatecos, Museo de la Canción Yucateca" 
"Canción Yucateca"
"40 Años de Trova Yucateca" 
"Yucatán en el Tiempo" 
"Revista de la Universidad de Yucatán" 

1932 births
2009 deaths